Darwin Yang is an American chess grandmaster.

Chess career
In 2008, Yang finished third in a tie-breaker for the under-12 group in the World Youth Chess Championship. This, along with Sam Shankland's identical result for the under-18 group, were top performances for American players.

In April 2011, Yang earned the International Master title at the SPICE Spring Chess Invitational by defeating IM Marc Esserman. Yang had achieved all three IM norms in West Texas.

In 2014, Yang won the Texas State Championship, hosted by the Texas Chess Association.

References

Living people
1996 births
American chess players
Chess grandmasters
Sportspeople from Dallas